Treintona, soltera y fantástica is a 2016 Mexican comedy film directed by Chava Cartas, and produced by Jose Alberto Lopez and Jose Manuel Flandes.  The film premiered on 7 October 2016, and is bases on the 2013 book of the same name by Juana Inés Dehesa. It stars Bárbara Mori as the titular character. The film had a budget of 26 million pesos and was able to raise 136. In October 2018, it was confirmed that the film will have a sequel turned into a spin-off entitled Veinteañera: Divorciada y fantástica and starring Paulina Goto.

Cast 
 Bárbara Mori as Inés
 Juan Pablo Medina as Sensei
 Jordi Mollà as Óscar
 Natasha Dupeyrón as Regina
 Marimar Vega as Camila
 Angélica Aragón as Catalina
 Héctor Bonilla as Arturo
 Karla Carrillo as Cuñada Inés
 Andrés Zuno as Chavo Antro
 Claudio Lafarga as Emilio
 Claudette Maillé as Renata
 Andrés Almeida as Marco
 Roberto Quijano as Hernán

References

External links 
 

Mexican comedy films